Euphrasia rostkoviana (synonym Euphrasia officinalis), also known as eyebright or eyewort, is a plant from the genus Euphrasia, in the family Orobanchaceae.

Euphrasia rostkoviana herb has been used in the traditional Austrian medicine internally as tea, or externally as compresses, for treatment of disorders of the eyes and the gastrointestinal tract.

References

rostkoviana